A fat camp, weight loss camp, or fat farm is a type of residential program where people who are overweight or obese go to attempt to lose weight through exercise and lifestyle changes.

Overview
One goal of weight loss camps is to help the guests lose weight.

Some programs not only focus on weight loss, but on changing behavior through a combination of training on self-regulatory behaviors and cognitive-behavioral therapy (CBT), as well as maintaining weight loss after campers return home. Some experts believe these are key elements of an effective program.

One study found that adolescents reported decreased body shape dissatisfaction and increased self-esteem immediately after losing weight at a weight loss camp. These improvements were directly related to the amount of weight lost, with the greatest benefit to those adolescents who lost the most weight.

In popular culture
Multiple films and television shows have featured programs such as these, including:

Films
 Fat Camp: An MTV Docs Movie Presentation (2006), a documentary television film about five teens at a camp called Camp Pocono Trails (CPT), in the Poconos, Pennsylvania.
 Heavyweights (1995),  an American comedy film centered around a camp for kids that is taken over by a fitness guru.

Television
 "Fat Camp" (South Park), season 4, episode 15 of the animated television series South Park, original airdate December 6, 2000: in the episode, Cartman is sent to lose weight at a fat camp where he discovers a different way to earn money.
The Biggest Loser,  a reality television format which started with the American TV series The Biggest Loser in 2004, which centers on overweight and obese participants competing against each other to lose the highest percentage of weight (or most weight) to become the "biggest loser".
Heavy is an American documentary series that aired on A&E. The series is filmed at the Hilton Head Health Wellness Resort and chronicles the weight loss efforts of people with severe obesity. It ran for one season, from January 17 to April 4, 2011.
Killer Queen (Family Guy) Season 10, Episode 16 of the animated FOX sitcom Family Guy, Peter and Chris Griffin attend a weight loss camp, but when some other campers are found dead, the blame falls on Lois Griffin's brother, Patrick Pewterschmit, as he was imprisoned for the murder of obese people.

See also 
 Fitness boot camp
 Wellspring camps

References

External links 
 Parents turn to fat camps for obesity solution, ABC
 [https://www.toqeerinfo4you.com/2023/01/Healthy-pasta-salad-for-weight-loss.html Healthy pasta salad for weight loss
], Weight Crafters
 Getting Physical: A different kind of summer camp aims to shape winners for life Seattle Times

Management of obesity
Summer camps